Francois Kleinhans is a South African rugby union player for the  in the Currie Cup and in the Rugby Challenge. He can operate as a flanker or eighthman. He also played for South Africa Under 20 in the 2011 IRB Junior World Championship.

References

External links
Sharks profile

itsrugby.co.uk

1991 births
Living people
Afrikaner people
Pumas (Currie Cup) players
Rugby union flankers
Rugby union players from Durban
Sharks (Currie Cup) players
South Africa Under-20 international rugby union players
South African rugby union players